Duo (also referred to as Hank Jones-Red Mitchel Duo) is an album by pianist Hank Jones and bassist Red Mitchell recorded in 1987 for the Dutch Timeless label.

Reception

AllMusic awarded the album 4 stars and its review by Ken Dryden states: "These two musicians usually make any date that they're a part of a success and this rare duo date together is no exception. Jones' effortlessly swinging style is matched beautifully by the bassist's imaginative lines". The Penguin Guide to Jazz summarized the album as "gorgeous", and wrote that "Jones works around and under the bassist's lines like the great accompanist he is".

Track listing
 "Gone With the Wind" (Herb Magidson, Allie Wrubel) – 6:17
 "What Am I Here For?" (Duke Ellington, Frankie Laine) – 6:55
 "A Child Is Born" (Thad Jones) – 6:09
 "Wee" (Denzil Best) – 5:29
 "Someone I love (a.k.a. Jam for your bread)" (Red Mitchell) – 4:16
 "Mean to Me" (Fred E. Ahlert, Roy Turk) – 4:27 		
 "I'll Remember April" (Gene de Paul, Patricia Johnston, Don Raye) – 8:17
 "But Beautiful" (Van Heusen, Burke) – 8:11

Personnel 
Hank Jones – piano
Red Mitchell – bass

References 

1988 albums
Red Mitchell albums
Hank Jones albums
Timeless Records albums
Albums recorded at Van Gelder Studio